H. sancta may refer to:

 Halcyon sancta, a synonym of Todiramphus sanctus, the sacred kingfisher
 Hadena sancta, a species of moth